Slavko Blagojević (born 21 March 1987) is a Croatian professional footballer who plays as a midfielder for Croatian Football League club Istra. He is a set-piece specialist.

Club career

NK Istra 1961
In 2012, Blagojević joined NK Istra 1961 on a free transfer. He made his debut coming of the bench for the last 32 minutes of the match, in a 0–0 draw against Hajduk Split. He quickly became an integral part of the squad, making a total of 29 appearances in his first season with the club, starting 25 times and gathering a total of 9 yellow cards.

In the 2013–14 season, Blagojević continued to be an integral part of the squad, starting in all 30 of his appearances. It was his most productive season as a player, scoring 8 times, despite playing as a defensive midfielder. His notoriety for gathering cards continued, as he gathered 13 yellow cards.

RNK Split
In 2014–15 Blagojević was appointed the club captain. He made 16 appearances for NK Istra 1961, scoring a goal in a 1–1 draw against RNK Split. He further netted two assists: one in a 2–1 loss to NK Zagreb and one in a 1–1 draw against Slaven Belupo. After the 19th matchday, in January 2015, he made a €230 000 transfer to RNK Split.

He made his debut for RNK Split immediately after his transfer, in the 20th matchday, in a 2–2 draw against NK Istra. He scored his first goal for his new club against NK Osijek, in a 3–2 victory. He ended up making a total of 11 games for RNK Split in the 2014/15 season.

Žalgiris
In 2015–16 season, Blagojević made 28 appearances for RNK Split, starting in each game. He scored three goals: one in a 2–1 win against NK Lokomotiva, one in a 2–1 win against NK Osijek and one against NK Istra. Next season, Blagojević made a free transfer to Žalgiris. He would play three seasons for his new club, making 77 appearances and scoring a single goal against Suduva.

NK Istra 1961
Blagojević returned to NK Istra during the 2019–20 winter transfer period, on a free transfer. He made 13 appearances for Istra in the 2019–20 season, playing his last game against NK Osijek in the 34th matchday. He was appointed club captain for 7 of those games.

He was once again appointed club captain for the entire 2020–21 season.

Honours
Žalgiris
A Lyga: 2016
Lithuanian Cup: 2016
Lithuanian Supercup: 2017

RFS
Latvian Cup: 2019

References

External links
 
 

1987 births
Living people
People from Otok, Vukovar-Srijem County
Association football midfielders
Croatian footballers
Croatia youth international footballers
HNK Cibalia players
NK Lučko players
NK Istra 1961 players
RNK Split players
FK Žalgiris players
FK RFS players
Croatian Football League players
A Lyga players
Latvian Higher League players
Croatian expatriate footballers
Expatriate footballers in Lithuania
Croatian expatriate sportspeople in Lithuania
Expatriate footballers in Latvia
Croatian expatriate sportspeople in Latvia